Panaeolus semiovatus var. semiovatus, also known as Panaeolus semiovatus and Anellaria separata, is a medium-sized buff-colored mushroom/toadstool that grows on horse dung, and has black spores. Though nonpoisonous, it is generally regarded as inedible, and a few people experience gastric upset after consumption. Its common names are the shiny mottlegill, or egghead mottlegill.

Description
The cap is up to 8 cm across, dark buff to white, parabolic to nearly convex in maturity. It is sticky when wet, and often wrinkles when dry.  The stem is 15 cm by 20 mm, solid and smooth, with an annulus (ring) that is white, but is often found blackened by falling spores. The gills are adnexed, being wider in the middle, and narrowing at both ends, they are brown to black. The flesh is white, or straw-colored.

This is a buff, or whitish-colored mushroom that grows in horse dung. It is widely distributed and is present in many temperate zones of the world.

The very similar Panaeolus semiovatus var. phalaenarum (Fr.) Ew. Gerhardt. 1996 syn. Panaeolus phalaenarum (Bull.) Quel. is more slender (cap 2–4 cm), and lacks the ring.

As seen below, this mushroom varies from white to dark buff in coloration.

See also

List of Panaeolus species

References

Further reading

External links

First Nature - Panaeolus semiovatus
Mykoweb - Panaeolus semiovatus
Panaeolus semiovatus photo

semiovatus var. semiovatus
Fungi of Europe
Fungi of North America
Inedible fungi